DYHT (94.3 FM), on-air as 94.3 iFM, is a radio station owned and operated by the Radio Mindanao Network. The station's studio is located at the RMN Broadcast Center, 17th Lacson St., Bacolod, while its transmitter is located at Sitio Aning, Brgy. Pahanocoy, Bacolod.

History
DYHT was RMN's 6th FM station in Bacolod, established in 1978 as 94.3 HT-FM, carrying a CHR/Top 40 format together with other RMN FM stations across the country, excluding DWHB in Baguio (which they carrying smooth jazz format) and DYXL in Cebu (which they carrying easy listening format). On August 16, 1992, the station was rebranded as Smile Radio 94.3, one of the few Smile Radio station with the same format, along with its flagship station in Cagayan de Oro. On November 23, 1999, it was rebranded again as 943 HTFM, with the slogan "Live it Up!". Some of the programs aired at that time were "The Alternative Zone", "Power 20 Hit Show", "Free Rock" and "Absolute Replay". On May 16, 2002, after almost 2 decades of being CHR/Top 40 station in the city, the station was relaunched as 94.3 iFM and switched to a mass-based format.

References

External links
iFM Bacolod FB Page

Radio stations established in 1978
Radio stations in Bacolod